VC Levski Sofia is a professional Bulgarian volleyball team based in Sofia. It has both men's and women's teams, both playing in its respective Bulgarian Volleyball Leagues. Founded in 1943, the team plays its home games at Levski Sofia Sports Hall in Sofia. The women's team became the first Bulgarian volleyball club that were crowned European champion in 1963–64 season. Levski is also the only Bulgarian club that reached 4 times European Cup finals and 6 times CEV Cup finals.

Men's volleyball

Honours

National competitions
  Bulgarian Championship: 15 
1945, 1959, 1980, 1985, 1992, 1997, 1999, 2000, 2001, 2002, 2003, 2004, 2005, 2006, 2009

  Bulgarian Cup: 17
1960, 1966, 1968, 1972, 1980, 1983, 1987, 1989, 1996, 1997, 2000, 2001, 2003, 2004, 2006, 2012, 2014

International competitions
   CEV Cup Runners-up: 1975, 1979, 1982, 1985, 1987, 1989
   CEV Champions League Third place: 1960

Team roster – season 2022/2023

Notable players
Players internationally capped for Bulgaria and Russia

Women's volleyball

Honours

National competitions
  Bulgarian Championship: 29  
1959, 1961, 1962, 1963, 1964, 1965, 1966, 1967, 1970, 1971, 1972, 1973, 1974, 1975, 1976, 1977, 1980, 1981, 1984, 1990, 1996, 1997, 1998, 1999, 2001, 2002, 2003, 2009, 2014

  Bulgarian Cup: 27
1959, 1960, 1961, 1966, 1967, 1970, 1972, 1973, 1974, 1978, 1980, 1987, 1990, 1991, 1992, 1994, 1997, 1998, 1999, 2001, 2002, 2003, 2005, 2006, 2009, 2014, 2016

International competitions
  CEV Champions League: 1
1963–64
 Runners-up: 1975, 1976, 1981

Notable players
Players internationally capped for Bulgaria
  Tanya Gogova
  Galina Stancheva
  Tanya Dimitrova
  Silviya Petrunova
  Rositsa Dimitrova

Team squad
Season 2016–2017, as of January 2017.

References

External links
 Official website

Bulgarian volleyball clubs
Sport in Sofia
Levski Sofia